Isaac Redman (born November 10, 1984) is a former American football running back. He was signed by the Pittsburgh Steelers as an undrafted free agent in 2009. He played college football at Bowie State University in Bowie, Maryland.

Early years
Redman played high school football and wrestled at Paulsboro High School. Although a standout player, his future career was nearly derailed completely with a sexual assault charge in his senior year of high school.  Redman pleaded out to a lesser charge of criminal sexual contact and was given three years' probation.

College career
Redman played college football at NCAA Division II Bowie State University (BSU) which is part of the Central Intercollegiate Athletic Association (CIAA).

Redman finished his career as Bowie State’s all-time rushing leader with 3,300 yards. Some of his other accomplishments at Bowie State include:
BSU Records in:
 Single Game Rushing Yards (218)
 Single Game Rushing Attempts (37)
 Single Season Rushing Attempts (281)
 Longest Run from Scrimmage (99 yards)
 Single Season Rushing yards (1,512).

Some of his other accolades include:
 All-CIAA Rookie Of The Year (2004)
 Team Offensive Player of the Year (2004)
 Offensive MVP of the Gold Bowl Classic (10/22/05)
 Offensive MVP of the CIAA Championship (11/5/05)
 BSU's Offensive MVP in the Pioneer Bowl (12/3/05)
 All-CIAA First-team (2005)
 All-CIAA First-team (2007)

Professional career

Pittsburgh Steelers
After going undrafted in the 2009 NFL Draft, Redman was signed by the Pittsburgh Steelers as an undrafted free agent on April 28, 2009. In his first professional appearance during the 2009 NFL Preseason on August 13, 2009, Redman rushed for 32 yards and 2 touchdowns against the Arizona Cardinals. Redman finished the preseason with 37 carries for 145 yards and 3 touchdowns.

Redman was waived during final cuts on September 4, 2009, and re-signed to the practice squad on September 6. He was signed off the practice squad on October 3 when defensive end Nick Eason was released, then waived on October 5 when Eason was re-signed. Redman was re-signed to the practice squad on October 7. On December 2, Redman was released from the practice squad. He was re-signed to the practice squad on December 9. He was signed to the active roster on January 6, 2010.

On September 7, 2010, Steelers head coach Mike Tomlin announced that Redman would be the team's primary goal-line back. On November 21, 2010, Redman scored his first pro touchdown against the Oakland Raiders.

At the end of the 2010 season, Redman and the Steelers appeared in Super Bowl XLV against the Green Bay Packers. He had two rushes for 19 yards and had one kickoff return for 13 yards in the 25–31 loss.

Redman got his first career start in week 5 during the 2011 NFL season against the Tennessee Titans. He rushed for 49 yards on 15 carries. He recorded 479 yards (4.4 YPC) and three touchdowns with his limited reps.

The Steelers waived Redman once again on October 21, 2013 after being placed on the inactive list for two consecutive games.

Redman Award 
In 2012, Steelers-centric SB Nation blog Behind the Steel Curtain created what is known as the "Redman Award." The award, inspired by Isaac Redman's impressive preseason play throughout his career, was to be awarded to a Steelers player, a sixth-round draft pick or lower, who had convinced the fan base throughout the preseason that they were a "diamond in the rough." Other stipulations include that the player must have spent two training camps or less with the Steelers and have had endeared themselves to the fan base regardless of their chances of making the team's final roster.

The first official appearance of the award on Behind the Steel Curtain's website was in 2014, when an article was published detailing the top candidates for the honor.

The award tradition is still carried out by the writers at Behind the Steel curtain to this day, with the winner being voted on in a poll open to all readers sometime around Labor Day weekend. The winners of the award include Adrian Robinson (2012), Alan Baxter (2013), Daniel McCullers (2014), Roosevelt Nix (2015), Tyler Matakevich (2016), Mike Hilton (2017), Matthew Thomas (2018), Tuzar Skipper (2019), Ulysees Gilbert III (2020), and Jamir Jones (2021).

The award has gained popularity, being mentioned by other Steelers blogs, and even Redman himself, who congratulated 2021 winner Jamir Jones on winning the award on Facebook, sharing the article as well.

Retirement
On August 22, 2014, Redman announced that he had suffered a career-ending injury to his spinal cord.

He is a coach for the Deptford Township, New Jersey youth football team.

References

External links
Bowie State Bulldogs bio
Pittsburgh Steelers bio
BSU Star Athlete's Road to Glory Ends in Pittsburgh

1984 births
Living people
Paulsboro High School alumni
People from Paulsboro, New Jersey
Players of American football from New Jersey
Sportspeople from Gloucester County, New Jersey
American football running backs
Bowie State Bulldogs football players
Pittsburgh Steelers players